Bachem may refer to:

 the Bachem Ba 349 Natter, a German rocket-powered interceptor prototype
 Bachem Holding, a Swiss company
 Erich Bachem, German engineer
 Martha Bachem, Austrian-German figure skater